Nebetiah may be a spelling variant for the names of two Ancient Egyptian princesses:

 Nebetia, possible granddaughter of Thutmose IV
 Nebetah, daughter of Amenhotep III and Tiye